Anna Camile Järphammar (born 13 January 1968) is a Swedish model, actress and TV host. She was initially made famous when she modeled for the furniture and home products giant IKEA in the mid-1990s (with exposed buttocks).

After presenting game shows and other entertainment shows on TV3 she starred as a leading character, Mikaela Malm, in the soap opera Vita lögner. In 2005, she became anchor for TV3 and its short news program "Update" (through 2007).

References

External links

Swedish Film Database

Swedish female models
Swedish television personalities
Swedish women television presenters
Swedish actresses
Living people
1968 births
People from Sundbyberg Municipality